North Stainley is a village in the Harrogate district of North Yorkshire, England  north of Ripon.

History
North Stainley is derived jointly from Old English and Old Norse and means a stone clearing. The village is mentioned in the Domesday Book with 15 ploughlands and belonging to the Archbishop of York. The name of the village derives from the Old English of Stān lēah, which means a stone wood or clearing. North Stainley is on the south bank of the River Ure, and was in the West Riding of Yorkshire until 1974, when it was moved into North Yorkshire. It was formerly in the wapentake of Claro, and the Liberty of Ripon.

The population of the parish in the 2001 census was 604, rising to 737 at the 2011 Census. In 2015, North Yorkshire County Council estimated the population of the parish to be 760. The parish includes the hamlet of Sleningford.

The village is cut through by the A6108 road between Ripon and Leyburn. It has a school, North Stainley Church of England Primary School, which is rated as being Good by Ofsted and a church, St Mary the Virgin. The church was built in 1840 by the Staveley family, who owned the manor and built the Manor House in the 16th century. The pub in the village is called The Staveley Arms.

Since 1983, the parish has been part of the Skipton and Ripon Parliamentary constituency.

References

External links

North Stainley village website

Villages in North Yorkshire